Jeanine Marie Mason (born January 14, 1991) is an American actress and dancer. Her acting career began after winning the fifth season of the Fox television show So You Think You Can Dance. She is best known for her role as Liz Ortecho in the CW's drama series Roswell, New Mexico.

Mason had a recurring role as Dr. Sam Bello on Grey's Anatomy. She has also appeared in Bunheads, Of Kings and Prophets, You’re the Worst, Awkward, Major Crimes, NCIS: Los Angeles, CSI: Crime Scene Investigation and Big Time Rush.

Mason became the first Cuban-American to win So You Think You Can Dance. Her film credits include the thriller Default opposite David Oyelowo and The Archer opposite Bailey Noble.

On stage, she was last seen in Center Theatre Group's 2017 revival of Zoot Suit directed by playwright Luis Valdez opposite Demián Bichir.

Early life and education
Mason was born in Miami, Florida, and grew up in a dance-oriented family in Pinecrest. Both of her parents are of Cuban descent. Mason began her dance training at the age of three in ballet and flamenco, and went on to study jazz, acrobatics, hip-hop, modern, and contemporary dance. Mason began her study of theatre at age 11 with community and middle school productions. Upon moving to Los Angeles, California, Mason continues to study theater while also keeping a focus on film and television at the Michael Woolson Studio. Mason earned a Bachelor of Arts in World Arts and Cultures, graduating cum laude, from the University of California, Los Angeles in the spring of 2014.

Career

So You Think You Can Dance
At the age of 18, Mason competed on the fifth season of the show So You Think You Can Dance, becoming the youngest winner in the history of the competition over fellow contestants Brandon Bryant, Kayla Radomski, and Evan Kasprzak. For the first five weeks of the competition (Top 20 to Top 12), Mason was partnered with Phillip Chbeeb. During the show's sixth week (Top 10), Mason danced a contemporary number choreographed by Travis Wall and was partnered with Jason Glover. Later, Mason was also partnered with Brandon Bryant, Ade Obayomi, Evan Kasprzak, and Kayla Radomski. Mason was consistently praised for her strong and versatile performances.

During the fall of 2009, Mason toured the United States with the top twelve dancers of the So You Think You Can Dance competition.

Acting career
Shortly after completing So You Think You Can Dance, Mason turned her full attention to channeling her performing skills into her other lifelong love, the craft of acting. Her on-screen career began when Mason starred in the Halloween episode of Nickelodeon's hit show, Big Time Rush. From there, she appeared in The Bling Ring, CSI: Crime Scene Investigation, The Fresh Beat Band and Hollywood Heights before landing the recurring role of Cozzette on ABC Family's Bunheads and leading roles in Hot Mess and Delirium. She has also booked roles on Major Crimes and Secret Life of the American Teenager as well as several smaller, independent projects. Mason had a recurring role on ABC's hit medical drama Grey's Anatomy as Dr. Sam Bello.

In February 2018, it was announced that she joined the pilot of Roswell, New Mexico as Liz Ortecho. The CW ordered the show to series on May 11, 2018.

Mason performed on November 29, 2009 at the Dizzy Feet Gala in Los Angeles, California at the Kodak Theatre. She and Jason Glover performed their popular contemporary piece, "If It Kills Me", choreographed by Travis Wall, and originally performed Top 10 week on SYTYCD. Glover has described Mason as "Unique. You just don’t find dancers like her. She has beautiful lines, is funky and charismatic, and has so much life onstage. Not only does it show in her movement but also on her face. Jeanine is a brilliant performer and one of my favorite people to watch—not just in our group, but out of any dancer I've seen, from Gregory Hines to Gene Kelly."

On November 9, 2010, Mason performed a contemporary-ballroom dance with Mark Ballas to John Legend's "Ordinary People" on the television show, Dancing With the Stars.

Her sister, Alexis, also auditioned for the eighth season of So You Think You Can Dance, and made it to the final solo performances before Top 20 in Vegas.

Performances

Filmography

References

External links
 
 

1991 births
Living people
Actresses from Miami
American people of Cuban descent
American contemporary dancers
American television actresses
American film actresses
So You Think You Can Dance (American TV series) contestants
So You Think You Can Dance winners
Hispanic and Latino American actresses
People from Pinecrest, Florida
21st-century American actresses
21st-century American dancers
University of California, Los Angeles alumni